The Howard County Courthouse is located at North Main and Bishop Streets in Nashville, Arkansas, the seat of Howard County.  It is a two-story brick building in the shape of an H, built in 1939 with funding from the Public Works Administration.  It is Moderne in style, designed by the Little Rock firm Erhart & Eichenbaum.  The front facade, facing east, has a central entrance framed in black marble, an element repeated on the secondary entrances on the north and south facades.  The interior hallways are covered in expanses of tile in earth tones, and the Art Deco woodwork in the courtrooms is original to the period.

The building was listed on the National Register of Historic Places in 1990.

See also
National Register of Historic Places listings in Howard County, Arkansas

References

Courthouses on the National Register of Historic Places in Arkansas
County courthouses in Arkansas
Streamline Moderne architecture in Arkansas
Public Works Administration in Arkansas
Nashville, Arkansas
National Register of Historic Places in Howard County, Arkansas
1939 establishments in Arkansas
Government buildings completed in 1939